The 1938 King's Birthday Honours in New Zealand, celebrating the official birthday of King George VI, were appointments made by the King to various orders and honours to reward and highlight good works by New Zealanders. They were announced on 9 June 1938.

The recipients of honours are displayed here as they were styled before their new honour.

Knight Bachelor
 Albert Fuller Ellis  – of Auckland; New Zealand member of the British Phosphate Commission.

Order of Saint Michael and Saint George

Companion (CMG)
 Richard Oliver Gross – of Auckland; a prominent sculptor.
 John Wood  – engineer-in-chief and under-secretary of the Public Works Department.

Order of the British Empire

Knight Commander (KBE)
Civil division
 Professor Thomas Hill Easterfleld   – of Nelson; formerly director of the Cawthron Institute of Scientific Research.

Commander (CBE)
Civil division
 Annie Elizabeth Kelly – of Christchurch; a prominent artist.
 William Sanderson La Trobe – of Wellington; formerly superintendent of technical education, Education Department.

Officer (OBE)
Civil division
 Sadie Macdonald – of Wellington. For social-welfare services.
 James Wallace  – of Dunedin; chairman of the Otago Education Board.

Military division
 Major Eric Freeman Clayton-Greene – officer commanding 2nd Medium Battery, New Zealand Artillery (Territorial Force); of Hamilton.

Member (MBE)
Civil division
 Elsie Euphemia Andrews – formerly infant mistress, Fitzroy School, New Plymouth
 John Connell Brown – of Westport. For social-welfare services.
 Robina Thomson Cameron – of Rotorua; district health nurse.
 Katharina Margarita Finnane – matron of Porirua Mental Hospital.
 John Henry O'Donnell – of Wellington; formerly assistant under-secretary, Lands and Survey Department.

Military division
 Paymaster-Lieutenant Herbert Russell Sleeman – New Zealand Division of the Royal Navy; assistant naval secretary, Wellington.
 Warrant Officer William Stanley Simpson – Royal New Zealand Air Force; of Christchurch.

British Empire Medal
Civil division
 Staff Sergeant-Major Edward James Barwell – senior orderly, Government House, Wellington.

References

Birthday Honours
1938 awards
1938 in New Zealand
New Zealand awards